Maciej Śliwa (born 22 May 2001) is a Polish professional footballer who plays as an attacking midfielder for ŁKS Łódź.

Career statistics

Club

Notes

Honours
Miedź Legnica
I liga: 2021–22

References

2001 births
Living people
People from Starachowice
Polish footballers
Poland youth international footballers
Association football midfielders
Ekstraklasa players
I liga players
III liga players
Wisła Kraków players
Miedź Legnica players
ŁKS Łódź players